Mokraya Olkhovka is a rural locality (a selo) and the administrative center of Mokroolkhovskoye Rural Settlement, Kotovsky District, Volgograd Oblast, Russia. The population was 860 as of 2010. There are 18 streets.

Geography 
Mokraya Olkhovka is located in steppe, on Volga Upland, on the Mokraya Olkhovka River, 30 km northeast of Kotovo (the district's administrative centre) by road. Kryachki is the nearest rural locality.

References 

Rural localities in Kotovsky District